A sound change, in historical linguistics, is a change in the pronunciation of a language. A sound change can involve the replacement of one speech sound (or, more generally, one phonetic feature value) by a different one (called phonetic change) or a more general change to the speech sounds that exist (phonological change), such as the merger of two sounds or the creation of a new sound. A sound change can eliminate the affected sound, or a new sound can be added. Sound changes can be environmentally conditioned if the change occurs in only some sound environments, and not others.

The term "sound change" refers to diachronic changes, which occur in a language's sound system. On the other hand, "alternation" refers to changes that happen synchronically (within the language of an individual speaker, depending on the neighbouring sounds) and do not change the language's underlying system (for example, the -s in the English plural can be pronounced differently depending on the preceding sound, as in bet[s], bed[z], which is a form of alternation, rather than sound change). Since "sound change" can refer to the historical introduction of an alternation (such as postvocalic /k/ in the Tuscan dialect, which was once [k] as in di [k]arlo 'of Carlo' but is now [h] di [h]arlo and alternates with [k] in other positions: con [k]arlo 'with Carlo'), that label is inherently imprecise and must often be clarified as referring to either phonemic change or restructuring.

Research on sound change is usually conducted under the working assumption that it is regular, which means that it is expected to apply mechanically whenever its structural conditions are met, irrespective of any non-phonological factors like the meaning of the words that are affected. Apparent exceptions to regular change can occur because of dialect borrowing, grammatical analogy, or other causes known and unknown, and some changes are described as "sporadic" and so they affect only one or a few particular words, without any apparent regularity.

The Neogrammarian linguists of the 19th century introduced the term sound law to refer to rules of regular change, perhaps in imitation of the laws of physics, and the term "law" is still used in referring to specific sound rules that are named after their authors like Grimm's Law, Grassmann's Law etc. Real-world sound changes often admit exceptions, but the expectation of their regularity or absence of exceptions is of great heuristic value by allowing historical linguists to define the notion of regular correspondence by the comparative method.

Each sound change is limited in space and time and so it functions in a limited area (within certain dialects) and for a limited period of time. For those and other reasons, the term "sound law" has been criticized for implying a universality that is unrealistic for sound change.

A sound change that affects the phonological system or the number or the distribution of its phonemes is a phonological change.

Principles

The following statements are used as heuristics in formulating sound changes as understood within the Neogrammarian model. However, for modern linguistics, they are not taken as inviolable rules but are seen as guidelines.

Sound change has no memory: sound change does not discriminate between the sources of a sound. If a previous sound change causes X,Y > Y (features X and Y merge as Y), a new one cannot affect only an original X.

Sound change ignores grammar: a sound change can have only phonological constraints, like X > Z in unstressed syllables. For example, it cannot only affect adjectives. The only exception to this is that a sound change may or may not recognise word boundaries, even when they are not indicated by prosodic clues. Also, sound changes may be regularized in inflectional paradigms (such as verbal inflection), in which case the change is no longer phonological but morphological in nature.

Sound change is exceptionless: if a sound change can happen at a place, it will. It affects all sounds that meet the criteria for change. Apparent exceptions are possible, because of analogy and other regularization processes, another sound change, or an unrecognized conditioning factor. That is the traditional view expressed by the Neogrammarians. In past decades, however, it has been shown that sound change does not necessarily affect all possible words. However, when a sound change is initiated, it often eventually expands to the whole lexicon. For example, the Spanish fronting of the Vulgar Latin [g] (voiced velar stop) before [i e ɛ] seems to have reached every possible word. By contrast, the voicing of word-initial Latin [k] to [g] occurred in colaphus > golpe and cattus > gato but not in canna > caña. See also lexical diffusion.

Sound change is inevitable: All languages vary from place to place and time to time, and neither writing nor media prevents that change.

Formal notation

A statement of the form

A > B

is to be read, "Sound A changes into (or is replaced by, is reflected as, etc) sound B". Therefore, A belongs to an older stage of the language in question, and B belongs to a more recent stage. The symbol ">" can be reversed, B < A, which also means that the (more recent) B derives from the (older) A":

POc. *t > Rot. f

The two sides of such a statement indicate only the start and the end of the change, but additional intermediate stages may have occurred.

 t >  > f

Unless a change operates unconditionally (in all environments), the context in which it applies must be specified:

A > B /X__Y

= "A changes to B when it is preceded by X and followed by Y."

For example:

It. b > v /[vowel]__[vowel], which can be simplified to just
It. b > v /V__V (in which the V stands for any vowel)

= "Intervocalic [b] (inherited from Latin) became [v] in Italian" (such as in caballum, dēbet > cavallo 'horse', deve 'owe (3rd pers. sing.)'

Here is a second example:

PIr. [−cont][−voi] > [+cont]/__[C][+cont]

= "A preconsonantal voiceless non-continuant (voiceless stop) changed into corresponding a voiceless continuant (fricative) in Proto-Iranian (PIr.)" when it was immediately followed by a continuant consonant (a resonant or a fricative): Proto-Indo-Iranian *pra 'forth' > Avestan fra; *trayas "three" (masc. nom. pl.)> Av. θrayō; *čatwāras "four" (masc. nom. pl.) > Av. čaθwārō; *pśaws "of a cow" (nom. *paśu) > Av. fšāoš (nom. pasu). Note that the fricativization did not occur before stops and so *sapta "seven" > Av. hapta. (However, in the variety of Iranian that led to Old Persian, fricativization occurred in all clusters: Old Persian hafta "seven".)

The symbol "#" stands for a word boundary (initial or final) and so the notation "/__#" means "word-finally", and "/#__" means "word-initially":

Gk. [stop] > ∅ /__#

= "Word-final stops were deleted in Greek (Gk.)".

That can be simplified to

Gk. P > ∅ / __#

in which P stands for any plosive.

Terms for changes in pronunciation

In historical linguistics, a number of traditional terms designate types of phonetic change, either by nature or result. A number of such types are often (or usually) sporadic, that is, more or less accidents that happen to a specific form. Others affect a whole phonological system. Sound changes that affect a whole phonological system are also classified according to how they affect the overall shape of the system; see phonological change.

 Assimilation: One sound becomes more like another, or (much more rarely) two sounds become more like each other. Example: in Latin the prefix *kom- becomes con- before an apical stop or : contactus "touched", condere "to found, establish", connūbium "legal marriage". The great majority of assimilations take place between contiguous segments, and the great majority involve the earlier sound becoming more like the later one (e.g. in connūbium, m- + n becomes -nn- rather than -mm-). Assimilation between contiguous segments are (diachronically speaking) exceptionless sound laws rather than sporadic, isolated changes.
 Dissimilation: The opposite of assimilation. One sound becomes less like another, or (much more rarely) two sounds become less like each other. Examples: Classical Latin quīnque  "five" > Vulgar Latin *kinkʷe (whence French cinq, Italian cinque, etc.); Old Spanish omne "man" > Spanish hombre. The great majority of dissimilations involve segments that are not contiguous, but, as with assimilations, the great majority involve an earlier sound changing with reference to a later one. Dissimilation is usually a sporadic phenomenon, but Grassmann's Law (in Sanskrit and Greek) exemplifies a systematic dissimilation.
 Metathesis: Two sounds switch places. Example: Old English thridda became Middle English third. Most such changes are sporadic, but occasionally a sound law is involved, as Romance *tl > Spanish ld, thus *kapitlu, *titlu "chapter (of a cathedral)", "tittle" > Spanish cabildo, tilde. Metathesis can take place between non-contiguous segments, as Greek amélgō "I milk" > Modern Greek armégō.
 Lenition, softening of a consonant, e.g. stop consonant to affricate or fricative; and its antonym fortition, hardening of a consonant.
 Tonogenesis: Syllables come to have distinctive pitch contours.
 Sandhi: conditioned changes that take place at word-boundaries but not elsewhere. As in these examples, such features are rarely indicated in standard orthography. In a striking exception, Sanskrit orthography reflects a wide variety of such features; thus, tat "that" is written tat, tac, taj, tad, or tan depending on what the first sound of the next word is. These are all assimilations, but medial sequences do not assimilate the same way.
 Haplology: The loss of a syllable when an adjacent syllable is similar or (rarely) identical. This change usually affects commonly used words. The word haplology itself is sometimes jokingly pronounced "haplogy".
 Elision, aphaeresis, syncope, and apocope: all losses of sounds. Elision is the loss of unstressed sounds, aphaeresis the loss of initial sounds, syncope is the loss of medial sounds, and apocope is the loss of final sounds.
 Elision examples: in the southeastern United States, unstressed schwas tend to drop, so "American" is not  but . Standard English is possum < opossum.
 Syncope examples: the Old French word for "state" is estat, but the s disappeared, yielding état.
 Epenthesis (also known as anaptyxis): The introduction of a sound between two adjacent sounds. Examples: Latin humilis > English humble; in Slavic an -l- intrudes between a labial and a following yod, as *zemya "land" > Russian zemlya (земля). Most commonly, epenthesis is in the nature of a "transitional" consonant, but vowels may be epenthetic: non-standard English film in two syllables, athlete in three. Epenthesis can be regular, as when the Indo-European "tool" suffix *-tlom everywhere becomes Latin -culum (so speculum "mirror" < *speḱtlom, pōculum "drinking cup" < *poH3-tlom). Some scholars reserve the term epenthesis for "intrusive" vowels and use excrescence for intrusive consonants.
 Prothesis: The addition of a sound at the beginning of a word. Example: word-initial  + stop clusters in Latin gained a preceding  in Old Spanish and Old French; hence, the Spanish word for "state" is estado, deriving from Latin status.
 Nasalization: Vowels followed by nasal consonants can become nasalized. If the nasal consonant is lost but the vowel retains its nasalized pronunciation, nasalization becomes phonemic, that is, distinctive.

Examples of specific sound changes in various languages

 Anglo-Frisian nasal spirant law
 Canaanite shift
 Cot-caught merger
 Dahl's law
 Grassmann's law
 Great Vowel Shift (English)
 Grimm's law
 High German consonant shift
 Kluge's law
 Phonetic change "f → h" in Spanish
 Ruki sound law
 Slavic palatalization
 Sound change in Japanese
 Umlaut
 Verner's law

Notes

References
 Anttila, Raimo (1989). Historical and Comparative Linguistics. John Benjamins.
 Campbell, Lyle (2004). Historical Linguistics: An Introduction. The MIT Press.
 Hale, Mark (2007). Historical Linguistics: Theory and Method. Oxford, Blackwell
 Hock, Hans Henrich (1991). Principles of Historical Linguistics. Mouton De Gruyter.
 McDorman, Richard E. (1999). Labial Instability in Sound Change. Organizational Knowledge Press.
 Morley, Rebecca (2019). Sound Structure and Sound Change: A Modeling Approach. Berlin: Language Science Press. . . Open Access. http://langsci-press.org/catalog/book/251
 Sihler, Andrew L. (2000). Language History: An Introduction. John Benjamins.

Historical linguistics
Phonology